Mirko Damjanović (Cyrillic: Мирко Дамјановић) (1937 – 25 December 2010) was a Serbian football coach. He was head coach of FK Partizan from 1973 to 1974.

He also worked at FK Rad, FK Leotar and FK Sartid among others, and finished his career as a coach of FK Takovo. Damjanović died on 26 December 2010.

References

External links
Večernje novosti article

1937 births
2010 deaths
People from Bugojno
Serbs of Bosnia and Herzegovina
Serbian football managers
Yugoslav football managers
FK Partizan managers